Floriston may refer to:
 
Floriston, California, census-designated place in Nevada County, California
Floriston railway station, railway station in the English county of Cumbria